Cootamundra railway station is located on the Main South line in New South Wales, Australia. It serves the town of Cootamundra. The property was added to the New South Wales State Heritage Register on 2 April 1999.

History
Cootamundra station opened on 1 November 1877 when the Main South line was extended from Harden-Murrumburrah. It served as the terminus until the line was extended to Bethungra on 15 April 1878.

On 1 June 1886, Cootamundra became a junction station when the Tumut & Kunama line opened as far as Gundagai. On 1 September 1893, the Lake Cargelligo line opened as far as Temora.

In 1901, an island platform was built, this has since closed but remains in situ. In 1943, the line through Cootamundra was duplicated with the largest overhead signal gantry in the Southern Hemisphere was erected. It has since been relocated and now stands preserved in the station surrounds.

The Lachlan Valley Railway has a base immediately south of the depot.

Description 

The station building is a type 5, first-class brick station originally dating from 1884 with alterations in 1904–05, 1915 and 1943. The platforms are faced in brick. A refreshment room sits on the up platform, dating from  1890 with 1904 additions. The branch platform has an additional awning at the Sydney end, which is considered particularly fine.

The complex also include a fibrous cement clad flat roofed signal box (1942), railway barracks (1932) and a type 3 gatekeeper's residence located in Cowcumba Street. The level crossing, steel pedestrian footbridge at south end, turntable, triangle junction and the station's trees, signs and lights are also heritage-listed.

Services
Cootamundra is served by two daily NSW TrainLink XPT services in each direction operating between Sydney and Melbourne, and a twice weekly NSW TrainLink Xplorer between Griffith and Sydney split from Canberrra services at Goulburn. NSW TrainLink also operate road coach services from Cootamundra to Mildura, Tumbarumba, Queanbeyan, Bathurst, Dubbo and Condobolin.

Heritage listing 
Cootamundra is a major railway complex with a variety of buildings and an unusually designed first class station building not seen elsewhere. It is of significance both in the townscape and in the development of railways. The railway yard extending for almost the length of the town along its eastern boundary is a major element in the development of the town and the station buildings are at the terminus of one of the main streets in the town. The station building and its major platform awning are of particular significance with very fine detail in both the building and the cast iron columns and brackets of the canopy.

The station building has been substantially altered over its history and is an excellent example of the development of a major facility and the homogeneous way in which buildings can grow. Of particular interest is the marking of the station entry with a tower over the entry vestibule. Another important feature of the site is the particularly fine awning to the branch platform with extensive use of cast iron panels and columns. This is one of the finest such awnings in the State. The other elements of the site contribute to the understanding of it and illustrate how a major railway centre operated and was developed. The site also contains a number of mature trees that provide a pleasant setting for the complex.

Cootamundra railway station was listed on the New South Wales State Heritage Register on 2 April 1999 having satisfied the following criteria.

The place possesses uncommon, rare or endangered aspects of the cultural or natural history of New South Wales.

This item is assessed as historically rare. This item is assessed as scientifically rare. This item is assessed as arch. rare. This item is assessed as socially rare.

References

Attribution

External links

Cootamundra station details Transport for New South Wales

Easy Access railway stations in New South Wales
Railway stations in Australia opened in 1877
Regional railway stations in New South Wales
New South Wales State Heritage Register
Articles incorporating text from the New South Wales State Heritage Register
Main Southern railway line, New South Wales